

Overview 

The 151st General Assembly of the U.S. state of Georgia convened its first session on January 10, 2011, at the Georgia State Capitol in Atlanta.  The 151st Georgia General Assembly succeeded the 150th and served as the precedent for the 152nd General Assembly in 2013.

Officers

Senate

Presiding Officer

Majority leadership

Minority leadership

House of Representatives

Presiding Officer

Majority leadership

Minority leadership

Members of the State Senate

Changes in Membership from Previous Term
Two seats changed party control from the previous session, one due to defeat of an incumbent and the other due to a party switch (Tim Golden) the beginning of the 151st Georgia General Assembly saw thirteen new state senators. One defeated an incumbent in the General Election, one defeated an incumbent in the primary, Six replaced incumbents who had run for other office. Five replaced a senator who had retired.

Changes in Membership During Current Term

Announced Retirements

Members of the House of Representatives

Changes in Membership from Previous Term
Fourteen seats changed party control from the previous session, three due to defeat of an incumbent, three due to retirements/resignation or runs for other office and the other eight due to a party switch from the Democrats to the Republicans (Ellis Black, Amy Carter, Mike Cheokas, Bubber Epps, Gerald E. Greene, Bob Hanner, Doug McKillip, Alan Powell) the beginning of the 151st Georgia General Assembly saw thirty-four new representatives. One defeated an incumbent in the primary, three in the primary run-off, ten replaced incumbents who had run for other office. Sixteen replaced a representative who had retired.

Changes in Membership During Current Term

External links

Georgia General Assembly website
2011-2012 Representatives by Name,  District
2011-2012 Senators by Name,  District

Georgia (U.S. state) legislative sessions
2011 in American politics
2012 in American politics
2011 in Georgia (U.S. state)
2012 in Georgia (U.S. state)